Cashelore, also called Cashel Bir or Bawnboy, is a stone ringfort (cashel) and National Monument located in County Sligo, Ireland.

Location

Cashelore is located on the southern slopes of Benbo Mountain, 1.3 km (¾ mile) northwest of Ballintogher.

History

Cashelore was built in the early Christian period (AD 400–1100). The name may mean "Fort Pride", while Cashel Bir is caiseal bir, "stone ringfort of stakes", presumably meaning that there was a palisade surrounding it, and Bawnboy is bábhún buidhe, "yellow walled enclosure."

Skeletons were formerly found near the fort.

It is believed to be identical with Caislen-in-nuabhair, mentioned in the Annals of Loch Cé, entry for 1389:

The O'Rourkes were kings of West Breifne (roughly County Leitrim), while the Ó hÉilidhe (Healys) were based around the Curlew Mountains, Ballinafad and the west of Lough Arrow. Per dolum is Latin for "by trickery." The Ó Fearghail ruled Angaile (roughly County Longford).

Description

A souterrain led to the bottom of the hill and could have functioned as an escape route.

References

National Monuments in County Sligo
Archaeological sites in County Sligo